Prep for Prep is a leadership development and gifted education program dedicated to expanding educational access to students of color. The organization's programs are targeted toward high achieving New York City minority students and helps with scholarships placement into many of the most respected secondary schools and colleges in the country.

The New York Times has referred to the Prep for Prep program as the "ticket to the top [through] admission to one of the nation's premier colleges."

History
Prep for Prep was founded in 1978 by Gary Simons, a public-school teacher in the Bronx, starting with 25 students from diverse and low-income backgrounds and three teachers known as "Contingent I". During Prep for Prep's first year, eleven independent schools committed places for Prep students and 22 students matriculated from those schools. Within a year of inception, the acceptance rate had fallen to 12%.

In 1988, Prep for Prep expanded its mission to independent boarding schools, launching a program known as "PREP 9" under the leadership of Peter Bordonaro. PREP 9 helps the brightest and most hardworking minority students in New York City and the metropolitan areas of Westchester, Long Island, New Jersey, and Connecticut prepare for success at leading independent boarding schools across the Northeast. The selection process begins in the 7th grade, when students apply to PREP 9 for entry into boarding schools in 9th grade. Space in the PREP 9 program is reserved for students who demonstrate very strong academic performance and high financial need, and as such, PREP 9 considers family income and financial assets as part of its application process.

In 1989, Contingent I students complete undergraduate studies, graduating from Columbia, Cornell, Harvard, Northwestern, Oberlin, The University of Pennsylvania, and Princeton.

In 2000, the Goldman Sachs Foundation granted Prep for Prep over $1mm to expand the organization’s program and prepare significantly larger numbers of high potential underrepresented youth for selective colleges.

In 2002, founder Gary Simons was succeeded by Aileen Heffernan.

By 2011, over 1,000 Prep for Prep students had graduated from college. and by 2018, over the number had increased to more than 3,000 Prep for Prep alumni.

In 2020, the Board of Trustees selected Ruth Jurgensen to succeed Aileen Heffernan after 25 years leading the organization.

Today, the Prep for Prep community includes over 3,500 students and alumni, having matriculated over 44 contingents since inception. Each year, Prep for Prep hosts a charity gala called the "Lilac Ball" which is regularly attended by famous patrons.

Student selection
Each year, a citywide "talent search" selects about 125 minority students, including 95 fifth graders and 30 sixth graders. To qualify for recruitment, 5th graders must have a scaled score of 330 or above on the English Language Arts (ELA) test administered during their 4th grade school year, or have scored in the 90th percentile on any standardized reading test administered in that school year. 6th graders must have a scaled score of 335 (90th percentile) or above on the ELA exam administered during their 5th grade school year. Applicants then undergo a series of interviews and further standardized testing to determine admission into the program. Fifth and sixth graders are admitted into Prep for Prep and earn spots at leading day schools in New York City.

Program
Admitted students undergo a 14-month academic course known as the "Preparatory Component" before their sixth or seventh-grade year, which includes two intensive seven-week summer sessions and after-school Wednesday and all-day Saturday classes during the intervening school year. Courses range from History, Algebra, Pre-Algebra, Research, Latin, French, Spanish, Literature, Writing Conference, and Science, which includes biology, physics, and chemistry, Invictus, a sociology and psychology-based course, PIMAS (Problems and Issues in Modern American Society), term paper research, and newly added Computer Science in 2021. An average of 60 percent of students successfully complete this program and are placed in schools chosen from among three dozen leading New York City independent schools. These 36 schools commit places, especially for Prep for Prep students, and almost $12 million annually in scholarships. Throughout the program and past high school graduation, students also receive personal and academic counseling, college counseling, and career counseling, and participate in leadership and community development activities as well as parties and special trips for alumni.

The program continues to help the students post-college with placement into positions at prestigious firms such as Goldman Sachs, Google, and J.P. Morgan Chase through corporate partnerships designed to expand diverse talent pools on Wall Street, in engineering, and across business.

School placement

Secondary school placement 
Prep for Prep day students are commonly placed at some of the nation's leading independent schools as Allen-Stevenson School, Berkeley Carroll, The Brearley School, The Browning School, The Buckley School, Calhoun, Chapin School, Collegiate, Columbia Grammar & Preparatory School, Dalton, Fieldston, Friends Seminary, Horace Mann, The Kew Forest School, Nightingale-Bamford, Packer Collegiate, Poly Prep, Riverdale Country School, Rye Country Day School, Grace Church School, Sacred Heart, Saint Ann's, St. Hilda's & St. Hugh's School, St. Bernard's School, Spence, Town, Trevor Day School, Village Community School, Hackley, Trevor Day, and Trinity School NYC.

PREP 9 boarding students commonly enroll at prestigious schools such as Choate, Andover, Exeter, Deerfield, Taft, Hotchkiss, Lawrenceville, The Hill School, Loomis Chaffee, and Middlesex.

College placement 
Prep for Prep works with students to help with placement into top-tier universities such as colleges in the Ivy League and NESCAC. Students have regularly attended Amherst College, Brown University, Cornell University, Columbia University, Dartmouth College, Duke University, Georgetown University, Harvard University, the University of Pennsylvania (including the Wharton School), Princeton University, Stanford University, Yale University.

Notable Alumni 
Prep for Prep has had numerous notable people associated with the organization since its inception, including judges, attorney generals, actors, educators, entrepreneurs, and bankers.

Notable students 
The following people were students of the Prep for Prep or PREP 9 programs:

 Kimberley S. Knowles — Associate Judge on the Superior Court of the District of Columbia
 Kristen Clarke — Assistant Attorney General for the Civil Rights Division at the United States Department of Justice
 Darrin Henson — choreographer, dancer, actor, director and producer
 Rob Brown — actor
 Angela Yee — radio personality
 Jabari Brisport — activist and former public school teacher
 Amina Gautier — writer
 Naima Coster — novelist
 Taha Abdul-Basser — Chaplin at Harvard University
 Evette Rios — television host

Notable faculty & staff 
The following people have served on the faculty or as staff members at Prep for Prep:

 Eva Moskowitz — CEO of Success Academy Charter Schools, former civics teacher at Prep for Prep

Notable board members 
The following people have served on the Prep for Prep board as trustees or associate council members:

 Charles F. Stewart — CEO of Sotheby's
 Arun Alagappan — Founder and President of Advantage Testing Foundation
 James Cole Jr. — Deputy Secretary of Education under President Barack Obama
 Daniel S. Loeb — hedge fund manager, Founder and CEO of Third Point Management
 Harold McGraw III — CEO and Chairman of McGraw Hill Companies (now S&P Global)
 Martin Lipton — lawyer, founding partner of law firm of Wachtell, Lipton, Rosen & Katz
 John Vogelstein — venture capitalist at Warburg Pincus

See also 

 Gifted education
 Sponsors for Educational Opportunity (SEO)
 Goldman Sachs Foundation — one of the major benefactors of Prep for Prep

References

External links
Prep for Prep Official Website

Education in New York City
Gifted education